These are the official results of the men's 400 metres event at the 1983 IAAF World Championships in Helsinki, Finland. There were a total number of 55 participating athletes, with seven qualifying heats and the final held on 10 August 1983.

Records
Existing records at the start of the event.

Results

Qualifying heats
The qualifying heats took place on 7 August, with the 55 athletes involved being splitted into 7 heats. The first 3 athletes in each heat ( Q ) and the next 11 fastest ( q ) qualified for the quarter-finals. 

Heat 1

Heat 2

Heat 3

Heat 4

Heat 5

Heat 6

Heat 7

Quarterfinals
The qualifying heats took place on 8 August, with the 32 athletes involved being splitted into 4 heats. The first 4 athletes in each heat ( Q ) qualified for the semifinals. 

Heat 1

Heat 2

Heat 3

Heat 4

Semifinals
The semifinals took place on 9 August, with the 16 athletes involved being splitted into 2 heats. The first 4 athletes in each heat ( Q ) qualified for the final. 

Heat 1

Heat 2

Final
The final took place on August 10.

References
 Results

 
400 metres at the World Athletics Championships